Caesium cadmium bromide (CsCdBr3) is a synthetic crystalline material. It belongs to the AMX3 group (where A = alkali metal, M = bivalent metal, X = halogen ion). Unlike most other bromides, CsCdBr3 is non-hygroscopic, giving it applications as an efficient upconversion material in solar cells. As a single crystal structure doped with rare-earth ions, it can be also used as active laser medium. It is highly transparent in the visible and infrared regions and can be used as a nonlinear optical crystal.

Caesium cadmium bromide with the formula Cs2CdBr4 has also been synthesized.

References

Metal halides
Caesium compounds
Cadmium compounds
Bromides
Crystals
Laser gain media